Queen of Fist, also known as Kung Fu Mama, is a 1972 Hong Kong action martial arts film directed by Lung Chien, produced by Raymond Chow, and starring Hsien Chin-Chu and Wong Fei-lung.

Plot 

An elderly mother travels to Shanghai to look for her missing son. To earn a living, she performs as a street artist with her grandchildren. She discovers that Lin Hie, boss of Shanghai French Concession, killed her son and is holding his daughter (her granddaughter) in captivity.

So, she wants to kill the gang leader.

Cast

 Hsien Chin-Chu as Kung Fu Mama
 Zhang Qingqing as Ma Ai-Chen
 Jimmy Wang Yu as 	Ma Yung-Chen
 Kang Kai
 Tzu Lan
 Wong Fei-lung as the gang leader
 Tang Chin
 Tian Ye
 Jin Dao
 Zhou Gui
 Huang Long
 Shan Mao

References

External links

1972 films
1972 martial arts films
1970s action films
1970s martial arts films
1970s Cantonese-language films
Films set in Shanghai
Films shot in Hong Kong
Hong Kong action films
Hong Kong films about revenge
Hong Kong martial arts films
Kung fu films
1970s Mandarin-language films
Films directed by Lung Chien
1970s Hong Kong films